The Ufa train disaster was a railway accident that occurred on 4 June 1989, in Iglinsky District, Bashkir ASSR, Soviet Union, when an explosion killed 575 people and injured 800 more. It is the deadliest rail disaster during peacetime in Soviet/Russian history.

Background 
The pipeline had originally been designed for the transportation of oil but had been reformatted to transport natural gas liquids for the Soviet petrochemical industry. In May 1984 the Soviet Ministry of Petroleum had canceled the installation of an automatic real time leak detection system. In 1985 an excavator caused severe mechanical damage to the pipe in the form of a  crack during bypass construction. Additionally on the night of the explosion there was increased pressure in the system due to increased demand.

Accident

At 1:15 a.m., two passenger trains of the Kuybyshev Railway carrying approximately 1,300 vacationers to and from Novosibirsk and a resort in Adler on the Black Sea exploded,  from the town of Asha, Chelyabinsk Oblast. Without anyone knowing, a faulty gas pipeline  from the line had leaked natural gas liquids (mainly propane and butane), and weather conditions allowed the gas to accumulate across the lowlands, creating a flammable cloud along part of the Kuybyshev Railway.

The explosion occurred after wheel sparks from the two passenger trains heading in opposite directions ignited this flammable cloud. Estimates of the size of the explosion have ranged from 250–300 tons TNT equivalent to up to 10 kilotons TNT equivalent.

Military units and medical teams were dispatched to the scene of the accident, many of whom searched the surrounding woods and mountains in case victims managed to escape from the scene of the accident. Scenes of the accident were streamed on Soviet television channels, with images of both the accident and victims being shown. Victims were initially evacuated to nearby towns for basic first aid, before they were evacuated by medical vehicles and helicopters to Ufa and Chelyabinsk or flown via Aeroflot to Moscow for the most severely injured. The total evacuation took 16 hours and 45 minutes with 806 people admitted to hospitals and burn centers.

Victims 
Many of the victims died later in hospital; official figures are 575 dead and over 800 injured, but an unofficial estimate of the number of deaths is approximately 780. 181 of the dead were children. 

Many survivors received severe thermal burns and brain injuries. Of the reported 469 survivors, 109 were children with a majority of them hospitalized. A seventeen member burn team flew from San Antonio, Texas to Ufa to help assist in the care and management of about 150 burn patients. The group returned to Moscow for evaluation and treatment of about 25 children seven months after the disaster, with hepatitis, cardiomyopathy and severe emotional disorders all seen in the children. A 16 person team from the UK went to Chelyabinsk to assist there.

Investigation 
On the afternoon of 4 June, Mikhail Gorbachev, Chairman of the Supreme Soviet of the USSR, and members of the government commission to investigate the accident visited the site. Rumors of sabotage were widespread in the local population, but a majority of officials believed the disaster was accidental. The Chairman of the Commission for Investigation of the accident was Deputy Chairman of the Council of Ministers of the USSR Gennady Vedernikov. The trial over the accident continued for six years, nine officials being charged, mostly members of Nefteprovodmontazh (the trust that constructed the faulty pipeline) including the chief of the construction and installation department of Nefteprovodmontazh and foremen. The charges were brought under Article 215, part II of the Criminal Code of the RSFSR, where the maximum penalty was five years imprisonment.

Potential causes 
According to Dmitry Chernov and Didier Sornette, the following factors contributed to the disaster:
 Hurried work culture,
 Cancelling the addition of telemetry,
 Taking authority to stop trains away from dispatchers, 
 Changing the type and the amount of the product sent through the pipe, 
 Changing the allowed pipe pressure (instead of inspecting the reasons for the fall of gas pressure),
 Cutting corners,
 No proper processes in place for safe working.

Another factor, aside from the gas leak's factor set, was reported to be the failure to respond to multiple reports of the presence of gas in the air prior to the explosion.

Aftermath 
The next day was declared a national day of mourning with flags lowered and entertainment programs cancelled. A planned resumption of the National Congress of People's Deputies was also cancelled.

References

External links
 
 
 
 
 
 
 
 
https://docs.google.com/document/d/1SLj1EikN3ON7UB-GFwxVM_Y0T3MSOwx7LnYZxfsffnY/. Full english version

Explosions in 1989
Railway accidents in 1989
Railway accidents and incidents in Russia
1989 disasters in Russia
Railway accidents and incidents in the Soviet Union
1989 in the Soviet Union
Gas explosions in Russia
Gas explosions
Pipeline accidents
History of Ufa
Rail transport in Chelyabinsk Oblast
1989 industrial disasters
June 1989 events in Europe
Train and rapid transit fires
Fires in the Soviet Union